Millicent Hall Illingworth (born 15 July 2005) is an Australian cricketer who currently plays for Victoria in the Women's National Cricket League (WNCL). She plays as a right-arm medium bowler.

Early life
Illingworth was born on 15 July 2005 in Geelong, Victoria.

Domestic career
In December 2022, Illingworth played for Victoria in the Cricket Australia Under-19 National Female Championships, taking nine wickets. In February 2023, she was named in a senior Victoria squad for the first time. She made her debut for the side on 10 February 2022, against Western Australia, where she took 4/41 from her 6.4 overs. She went on to play two further matches for the side that season.

International career
In December 2022, Illingworth was named in the Australia Under-19 squad for the 2023 ICC Under-19 Women's T20 World Cup. She was ever-present for the side at the tournament, taking four wickets at an average of 20.25 in her six matches. She was named Player of the Match in Australia's Super Six victory over India, in which she took 2/12 from her two overs.

References

External links

2005 births
Living people
Cricketers from Geelong
Australian women cricketers
Victoria women cricketers